Richard A. Rahoi (November 30, 1934 – March 24, 2016) was an American ski jumper who competed in the 1956 Winter Olympics. He was born in Iron Mountain, Michigan.

References

1934 births
2016 deaths
American male ski jumpers
Olympic ski jumpers of the United States
Ski jumpers at the 1956 Winter Olympics
People from Iron Mountain, Michigan